Cyrille Mubiala Kitambala (born 7 July 1974) is a Congolese former footballer who played as a defender.

He was part of the DR Congo squad for the 2004 African Cup of Nations, as well as for the 2006 Africa Cup of Nations.

References

1974 births
Living people
Footballers from Kinshasa
Democratic Republic of the Congo footballers
Democratic Republic of the Congo international footballers
2004 African Cup of Nations players
Democratic Republic of the Congo expatriate footballers
Expatriate soccer players in South Africa
Democratic Republic of the Congo expatriate sportspeople in South Africa
2006 Africa Cup of Nations players
AS Dragons players
AS Vita Club players
Cape Town Spurs F.C. players
Bloemfontein Celtic F.C. players
Association football defenders
21st-century Democratic Republic of the Congo people